Singhbhumi Odia  is the northernmost dialect of the Odia language spoken in the Kolhan region of Jharkhand constituting Seraikella-Kharsawan, West Singhbhum and East Singhbhum district.

References

Eastern Indo-Aryan languages
Odia language